Lajos Kiss (22 May 1934 – 31 August 2014) was a Hungarian sprint canoer who competed in the late 1950s. He won a bronze medal in the K-1 1000 m event at the 1956 Summer Olympics in Melbourne.

Kiss also won a silver medal in the K-1 4 x 500 m event at the 1958 ICF Canoe Sprint World Championships in Prague.

References

Sports-reference.com profile

1934 births
Canoeists at the 1956 Summer Olympics
Hungarian male canoeists
2014 deaths
Olympic canoeists of Hungary
Olympic bronze medalists for Hungary
Olympic medalists in canoeing
ICF Canoe Sprint World Championships medalists in kayak
Medalists at the 1956 Summer Olympics
20th-century Hungarian people